
Gmina Gołcza is a rural gmina (administrative district) in Miechów County, Lesser Poland Voivodeship, in southern Poland.

The gmina contains part of the protected area called Dłubnia Landscape Park.

Villages
Gmina Gołcza contains the villages and settlements of Adamowice, Buk, Chobędza, Cieplice, Czaple Małe, Czaple Wielkie, Gołcza, Kamienica, Krępa, Laski Dworskie, Maków, Mostek, Przybysławice, Rzeżuśnia, Szreniawa, Trzebienice, Ulina Mała, Ulina Wielka, Wielkanoc, Wysocice, Żarnowica and Zawadka.

Neighbouring gminas
Gmina Gołcza is bordered by the gminas of Charsznica, Iwanowice, Miechów, Skała, Słomniki, Trzyciąż and Wolbrom.

References
 Polish official population figures 2006

Golcza
Miechów County